Sabor River, Rio Sabor in Portuguese, is a river that rises in Spain and enters Portugal in the Natural Park of Montesinho, in the northeast of the country. It is a tributary of the right bank of the Douro River, passing near the city of Bragança from where it receives the waterbody of the River Fervença, going to empty close to the Torre de Moncorvo downstream of the Pocinho Dam, in the village of Foz do Sabor. The Sabor River basin is a large basin (3170 km2) located in the northeast of Portugal and used mostly for agroforestry.

References

Rivers of Portugal
Rivers of Spain